KREZ (104.7 MHz) is an FM radio station airing a soft adult contemporary format licensed to Chaffee, Missouri.  The station serves the areas of Cape Girardeau and Sikeston, Missouri, and is owned by Withers Broadcasting, through licensee Withers Broadcasting Company of Missouri, LLC.

History
KREZ signed on July 1, 1990, as KYRX.

References

External links

Soft adult contemporary radio stations in the United States
REZ
Radio stations established in 1990
1990 establishments in Missouri